This article lists the Ministers of Governance, Public Administration and Housing of Catalonia.

List

References

External links
 

 
Governance, Public Administration and Housing